Galimard is a French perfume manufacture based in Grasse founded by Joseph Roux in 1950. The name of the manufacture is a tribute to Jean de Galimard.

History 
In 1747 Jean de Galimard, Lord of Seranon was a perfumer in Grasse. Galimard was the purveyor to the court of the King of France Louis XV.

References

External links 
 official site
Perfume houses
Companies based in Provence-Alpes-Côte d'Azur
1747 establishments in France
French companies established in 1747
Manufacturing companies established in 1747